Les Amants du pont Saint-Jean is a 1947 French film directed by Henri Decoin. It was entered into the 1947 Cannes Film Festival.

Plot 
Pilou and Augusta are in love, but Augusta's father, the conservative mayor of the city, does not look upon their relationship kindly. His reprobation is directed less at the boy himself than at his parents, Maryse and Alcide Garonne, who are living together unmarried. Pilou and Augusta run away, and the mayor finally accept their union provided that the Pilou's parents regularize their situation through marriage. This they do, but after their marriage, the lovers separate. Finally, Pilou's mother falls and dies on the bank of the Rhone, and Alcide, overwhelmed with grief, throws himself into the river.

Cast
 Nadine Alari as Augusta
 Odette Barencey as Amélie
 Pauline Carton as Tante Marguerite
 Marc Cassot as Pilou
 René-Jean Chauffard
 André Darnay as Doiren
 Pierre Darteuil as Rival
 Pierre Ferval
 Paul Frankeur as Girard
 René Génin as Labique
 Camille Guérini as Le brigadier
 Geneviève Morel as La bonne
 Gaby Morlay as Maryse
 Michel Simon as Garonne
 Madeleine Suffel as La parente

References

External links

1947 films
1947 comedy-drama films
1940s French-language films
French black-and-white films
Films directed by Henri Decoin
Films with screenplays by Jean Aurenche
French comedy-drama films
1940s French films